Daniel James "Danny" Kihano (March 16, 1933 – January 26, 2000) was an American businessman and politician.

Born in Waipahu, Hawaii, Kihano went to Waipahu High School and Honolulu Business College. He also went to Leeward Community College. Kihano owned Danny Kihano Insurance Agency. From 1970 to 1992, Kihano served in the Hawaii House of Representatives and was a Democrat. He served as speaker of the house in 1987, 1989, and 1991. In 1997, Kihano was convicted in the United States District of wire and mail fraud, and money laundering. However, Kihano was ordered released from federal prison in May 1999 because of poor health. Kihano died in Honolulu, Hawaii.

Notes

1933 births
2000 deaths
20th-century American politicians
20th-century American businesspeople
People from Honolulu County, Hawaii
Businesspeople from Hawaii
Speakers of the Hawaii House of Representatives
Democratic Party members of the Hawaii House of Representatives
Hawaii politicians convicted of crimes
Honolulu Business College alumni
Leeward Community College alumni